The Worst Witch is a British ITV television series about a group of young witches at a Magic Academy. The series stars Georgina Sherrington and Felicity Jones, and is based on The Worst Witch books by Jill Murphy. It aired for a total of three series between 1998 and 2001 before being followed by Weirdsister College. Most episodes revolved around the school, following the adventures of Mildred and her friends. The series was later followed by The New Worst Witch, which ran for two series and chronicled the experiences of Mildred's younger cousin Hettie as she attended the school. The series was rebooted in 2017 as The Worst Witch, a co-production between CBBC, ZDF and Netflix.

Series overview

Episodes

Series 1 (1998–1999)

Series 2 (1999–2000)

Series 3 (2000–2001)

References

External links
 
 Fansite

List
Lists of British children's television series episodes
Lists of fantasy television series episodes
Television episodes about witchcraft